Émile "Milou" Ntamack (born 25 June 1970) is a French former rugby union footballer. 
He played professionally for Stade Toulousain and France, winning 46 caps. Ntamack made his French debut against Wales during the 1994 Five Nations Championship. Ntamack was part of the Grand Slam winning sides in 1997. He was in the 1995 and 1999 World Cup squads. He initially announced his retirement in 2003 due to a facial injury, however he then stayed on for another year before retiring in 2004. His younger brother, Francis Ntamack was also capped by France. Ntamack coached the Espoirs team of the Stade Toulousain and the French U21 team which was the first Northern Hemisphere side to win the World Championships in this age category, held in the Auvergne in 2006.

Ntamack was the first man to lift the Heineken Cup, winning it in Cardiff Arms Park in 1996. He captained the Toulouse team to victory on the day against Cardiff. Toulouse won 21-18. He won the Heineken Cup for a second time in 2003.

As of 2007 he has been backs coach for the international French team.

Personal life
Ntamack was born in France to a Cameroonian father, and a French Pied-Noir mother. His brother Francis also was a professional rugby union player. His oldest son Romain Ntamack is also a professional rugby union player like his uncle and dad since 2017.

Notes

External links
 
 Interview of Milou Ntamack after the U21 French team that he coached won the 2006 World Cup

1970 births
Living people
Sportspeople from Lyon
French rugby union coaches
French rugby union players
Stade Toulousain players
Rugby union centres
Rugby union wings
Rugby union fullbacks
French sportspeople of Cameroonian descent
France international rugby union players
Black French sportspeople